Kordeyan or Kordiyan may refer to:
 Kordiyan, Fars
 Kordiyan, Hamadan
 Kordeyan, Razavi Khorasan
 Kordeyan, Tehran
 Kordeyan District, in Fars Province